Karina Niki Jett (née Mikelis) is a professional poker player.  She may be best known for her appearances on the GSN series Poker Royale Battle of the Sexes. Jett also appeared in Poker After Dark as well as Late Night Poker's fourth season.

Her husband is fellow Full Tilt Poker pro Chip Jett, one of the world's foremost tournament players.  The couple writes a column together for Card Player magazine, answering reader questions in a "he said/she said" format.

At the 2011 World Series of Poker, Jett finished second in the Ladies Championship. This was the third time she made the final table in this event. As of 2014, her total live tournament winnings exceed $500,000.

References

Living people
American poker players
Female poker players
Poker After Dark tournament winners
Year of birth missing (living people)
Bishop Gorman High School alumni